Robert Treat (February 23, 1624July 12, 1710) was a New England Puritan colonial leader, militia officer and governor of the Connecticut Colony between  1683 and 1698. In 1666 he helped found Newark, New Jersey.

Biography
Treat was born in Pitminster, Somerset, England, and emigrated to Massachusetts with his family in 1630, when he was six.  His father was Richard Treat and his mother was Alice Gaylord. In 1637, his family were early settlers at Wethersfield, Connecticut. He settled in Milford, Connecticut in 1639 and became one of the leaders of the New Haven Colony, serving in the General Court as its assembly was known.

On Christmas Day, 1647 he married Jane Tapp in Milford, with whom he had eight children. Jane died on October 31, 1703. He then married Mrs. Elizabeth (Powell) Bryan, the daughter of Elder Michael and Abigail Powell of Boston, on October 24, 1705. She was twice widowed before marrying Gov. Treat. She died on January 10, 1706.

Career
When the Connecticut Charter of 1662 forced the New Haven Colony to merge with Connecticut in 1665, Treat led a group of dissidents who left the colony. They moved to New Jersey in 1666 where they were joined by other dissidents from Branford, Connecticut, another part of the former New Haven Colony.  The dissidents from Branford were led by Abraham Pierson, the elder. Treat wanted the new community to be named Milford.  Pierson, a devout Puritan, preferred the name New Ark, and this place is now known as Newark. Treat returned to Milford, Connecticut in 1672 and lived there the rest of his life.

Treat headed the colony's militia for several years, principally against the Narragansett Indians. This included participating in King Philip's War in 1676, where he was named Commander-in-Chief of Connecticut's forces. Treat, for example, had a crucial role in fighting that took place near Deerfield, Massachusetts, along with 300 Connecticut militiamen. He also took part in the Great Swamp Fight, one of the bloodiest battles of the war, against the Narragansetts. He served on the Governor's Council continuously from 1676 to 1708.

First elected Governor in 1683, Treat was supplanted by Sir Edmund Andros in 1687, making Connecticut part of the Dominion of New England. Treat is credited with having a role in concealing the state's charter in the Charter Oak, and resumed his job as governor when the dominion scheme fell apart in 1689. He was re-elected annually until being defeated by Fitz-John Winthrop in 1698.

Death
Treat died in Milford, New Haven County, Connecticut, on July 12, 1710. He is interred at Milford Cemetery in Connecticut.

Notable descendants 
His descendants include:
 Robert Treat Paine (1731–1814), signer of the Declaration of Independence
 Thomas Edison (1847–1931), inventor
 Sidney Mason Stone (1803-1882), architect
Margaret Sidney (1844-1924) author of Five Little Peppers children's series.
 Nathaniel Treat (1798–1895), politician
 Joseph B. Treat (1836–1919), politician
 Charles Treat (1859–1941), general
 Charles H. Treat (1842–1910), Treasurer of the United States from 1905 to 1909
 Charles W. Woodworth (1865–1940), entomologist
 Treat Williams (b. 1951), Actor/Director/Singer/Pilot

References

Further reading
 Edward Paul Rindler, "The Migration from the New Haven Colony to Newark, East New Jersey: A Study of Puritan Values and Behavior, 1630-1720" PhD dissertation u of Pennsylvania; Dissertation Abstracts International (1978), 38#11 pp 6792–6792 online

External links 

 Robert Treat family tree 

 

1622 births
1710 deaths
People from Taunton Deane (district)
Colonial governors of Connecticut
People of colonial Connecticut
Kingdom of England emigrants to Massachusetts Bay Colony
History of Newark, New Jersey
American city founders
People from Somerset
Burials in Connecticut